Crandall University is a Baptist Christian liberal arts university located in Moncton, New Brunswick, Canada. It is affiliated with the Canadian Baptists of Atlantic Canada (Canadian Baptist Ministries).

History

The school was founded in 1949 under the name United Baptist Bible Training School (UBBTS), and served as both a secondary school and a Bible school by the Canadian Baptists of Atlantic Canada. Over two decades, the focus of the school gradually shifted toward post-secondary programs. In 1968, UBBTS became a Bible and junior Christian liberal arts college, and in 1970 the name was changed to Atlantic Baptist College (ABC).A sustained campaign to expand the school's faculty and improve the level of education resulted in ABC being able to grant full Bachelor of Arts degrees in 1983. Its campus at this time was located along the Salisbury Road, west of Moncton's central business district.

The institution moved to a new campus built on the Gorge Road, north of the central business district, in 1996. The name was changed to Atlantic Baptist University (ABU), a reflection of expanded student enrollment and academic accreditation. In 2003, the ABU sports teams adopted the name The Blue Tide. The institution was the first, and thus far only, English-language university in Moncton.  The Atlantic Baptist University Act was passed by the Legislative Assembly of New Brunswick in 2008.

On August 21, 2009 it was announced that the institution had changed its name to Crandall University in honour of Rev. Joseph Crandall, a pioneering Baptist minister in the maritime region. In conjunction with the university name change, Crandall Athletics took on a new identity as "The Crandall Chargers."

Controversy
In 2012, Crandall University came under public scrutiny for receiving municipal funds for having a scripturally based hiring policy consistent with its denomination's tradition, that is, forbidding the hiring of non-celibate LGBTQ people. This has been characterized by the press as an anti-gay hiring policy. That same year, the Crandall Student Association publicly broke with the university's administration over the policy, with the student president at the time telling the CBC, "The Christian faith does say do not judge others. And the Christian faith is all about love. So I feel that this policy – to me – doesn’t seem like it’s following those specific guidelines." In 2013, a year after the controversy erupted, the university opted to not apply for $150,000 in public funding that it had received annually. The university president also issued an apology, stating: "We wish to apologize for anything that Crandall University might possibly have communicated in the past that may have seemed unloving or disrespectful in any way toward any individual or groups."

Affiliations
Crandall is an affiliate member of the Association of the Registrars of the Universities and Colleges of Canada (ARUCC); a full member of the ARUCC regional association, the Atlantic Association of Registrars and Admissions Officers (AARAO); an active member of Christian Higher Education Canada (CHEC); and an active member of the New Brunswick Association of Private Colleges and Universities. However, Crandall faculty are not members of the Canadian Association of University Teachers (CAUT). In their report, the CAUT found that "while the university has a statement on academic freedom, it is significantly inconsistent with that of the CAUT and the majority of universities across the western world, and assurances that free enquiry is still possible within its constraints are unconvincing." They therefore recommended that Crandall University "be placed on the list of institutions 'found to have imposed a requirement of a commitment to a particular ideology or statement of faith as a condition of employment.'" 

The university is affiliated with the Canadian Baptists of Atlantic Canada (Canadian Baptist Ministries). It is a member of the Council for Christian Colleges and Universities.

Library and archives
Crandall University houses the Baptist Heritage Center whose 300 artifacts preserve the material history of Atlantic Baptists, the Convention of Atlantic Baptist Churches, and its predecessor organizations. The collection and archives includes objects used in worship services, furniture, musical instruments, church building architecture pictures and printed material.

Athletics
Crandall University is represented in the Atlantic Collegiate Athletic Association (ACAA) by 7 varsity teams. The Chargers teams include men's and women's soccer, basketball, and cross country, and women's volleyball. The Chargers also offer a boxing club program that competes internationally.

The Chargers have won four ACAA banners: women's soccer in 2003-04, men's cross country in 2021-22, and both men's and women's cross country in 2022-23.

Notable alumni
David Alward – former Premier of New Brunswick
Ken LeBlanc – entrepreneur
Ralph Richardson – first chancellor of the university
Cathy Rogers – politician

See also
 List of schools in Moncton
 Higher education in New Brunswick
 List of universities and colleges in New Brunswick

References

External links
Crandall University homepage
Crandall Athletics homepage

Education in Moncton
Universities in New Brunswick
1949 establishments in New Brunswick
Educational institutions established in 1949
Baptist universities and colleges
Baptist Christianity in Canada
Council for Christian Colleges and Universities
Christian universities and colleges in Canada
Private universities and colleges in Canada